Willie Keil's Grave State Park Heritage Site, part of the Washington State Parks system, is located on Washington State Route 6 north of Menlo, Washington and 5 miles southeast of Raymond. Hikers and bicyclists using the Willapa Hills Trail can access the site by making a slight crossing over the highway.

It holds the body of Willie Keil, the American son  of German-born American immigrants William Keil and Louisa Reiter, part of a religious community who planned to migrate West. Willie died in May 1855, in Missouri, days before the trek began; his body was preserved in alcohol and brought with the wagon train to current Washington state and buried. The community resettled at Aurora, Oregon. Other pioneers are also interred at the park.

References

Sources

External links
 at Washington State Parks

Cemeteries in Washington (state)